The 2019–20 Chicago State Cougars men's basketball team represented Chicago State University in the 2019–20 NCAA Division I men's basketball season. The Cougars were led by second-year head coach Lance Irvin. They played their home games at the Emil and Patricia Jones Convocation Center as members of the Western Athletic Conference. They finished the season 4–25, 0–14 in WAC play to finish in last place. They were set to be the No. 8 seed in the WAC tournament, however, the tournament was cancelled amid the COVID-19 pandemic.

Previous season
The 2018–19 Cougars finished the 2018–19 season 3–29, 0–16 in WAC play to finish in last place. They lost in the quarterfinals of the WAC tournament to New Mexico State.

For the third time in four years, the Cougars had the worst average point margin in Division I (−25.5 points).

Roster

Schedule and results

|-
!colspan=9 style=| Non-Conference Regular Season

|-
!colspan=9 style=| WAC Regular Season

|- style="background:#bbbbbb"
| style="text-align:center"|Mar 5, 20209:00 pm
|
| at Seattle
| colspan=5 rowspan=2 style="text-align:center"|Cancelled due to the COVID-19 pandemic
| style="text-align:center"|Redhawk CenterSeattle, WA
|- style="background:#bbbbbb"
| style="text-align:center"|Mar 7, 20203:00 pm
| 
| at Utah Valley
| style="text-align:center"|UCCU CenterOrem, UT
|-
!colspan=9 style=| WAC tournament
|- style="background:#bbbbbb"
| style="text-align:center"|Mar 12, 20202:00 pm, ESPN+
| style="text-align:center"| (8)
| vs. (1) New Mexico StateQuarterfinals
| colspan=5 rowspan=1 style="text-align:center"|Cancelled due to the COVID-19 pandemic
| style="text-align:center"|Orleans ArenaParadise, NV
|-

Source

References

Chicago State Cougars men's basketball seasons
Chicago State
Chicago State
Chicago State
2020 in Illinois
2020s in Chicago
Chicago State
Chicago State